is a Japanese manufacturer of specialty chemicals, polymers and agrichemicals.

Corporate affairs
Kureha Chemical Industries is a member of the Mizuho keiretsu.

Products

Polyglycolic acid
One of the company's long-term investments is in polyglycolic acid (PGA). The company developed a mass scale manufacturing technique for the chemical, which has been a development project of the company since the early 90s.  The company has stated a strategy of committing to invest in PGA for a long period, patiently waiting for market demand to develop. To manufacture PGA, the company invested 100 million in a manufacturing facility in Belle, West Virginia to be located nearby a Dupont plant that produces glycolic acid, a primary feedstock for PGA.

Polyphenylene sulfide
Kureha is the world's largest producer of polyphenylene sulfide, a heat-resistant polymer is used in industrial applications such as automotive electronics. The polymer its produced at the company's site in Iwaki, Japan and in Wilmington, United States by Fortron Industries, a joint venture of Kureha  and Celanese.

References

External links
 Official global website 

Chemical companies based in Tokyo
Manufacturing companies based in Tokyo
Companies listed on the Tokyo Stock Exchange
Japanese companies established in 1944
Japanese brands